Isogonal, a mathematical term meaning "having similar angles", may refer to:

Isogonal figure or polygon, polyhedron, polytope or tiling
Isogonal trajectory, in curve theory
Isogonal conjugate, in triangle geometry

See also
Isogonic line, in the study of Earth's magnetic field, a line of constant magnetic declination

Geometry